Ageia, founded in 2002, was a fabless semiconductor company. In 2004, Ageia acquired NovodeX, the company who created PhysX – a Physics Processing Unit chip capable of performing game physics calculations much faster than general purpose CPUs; they also licensed out the PhysX SDK (formerly NovodeX SDK), a large physics middleware library for game production.

Ageia was noted as being the first company to develop hardware designed to offload calculation of video game physics from the CPU to a separate chip, commercializing it in the form of the Ageia PhysX, a discreet PCIe card. Soon after the Ageia implementation of their PhysX processor, 
ATI and Nvidia announced their own physics implementations.

On September 1, 2005, AGEIA acquired Meqon, a physics development company based in Sweden. Known for its forward-looking features and multi-platform support, Meqon earned international acclaim for its physics technology incorporated in 3D Realms’ Duke Nukem Forever and Saber Interactive's TimeShift.

On February 4, 2008, Nvidia announced that it would acquire Ageia. On February 13, 2008, the merger was finalized.

The PhysX engine is now known as Nvidia PhysX, and has been adapted to be run on Nvidia's GPUs.

References

External links
AGEIA PhysX Physics Processing Unit Preview
AGEIA in 2007 – Is This the Year of the PPU?
BFG Ageia PhysX Card
PhysX In GRAW 2

2002 establishments in California
Companies based in Santa Clara, California
Companies disestablished in 2008
Defunct companies based in California
Fabless semiconductor companies
Semiconductor companies of the United States
Technology companies established in 2002